Trace amine-associated receptor 9 is a protein that in humans is encoded by the TAAR9 gene.

TAAR9 is a member of a large family of rhodopsin G protein–coupled receptors (GPCRs, or GPRs). GPCRs contain 7 transmembrane domains and transduce extracellular signals through heterotrimeric G proteins.[supplied by OMIM] N-Methyl piperidine is a ligand of TAAR9 associated with aversive behavior in mice. N,N-dimethylcyclohexylamine is an additional binding agonist that also activaes TAAR7 variants. 

TAAR9 gene deletion in rats leads to significantly decreased low-density lipoprotein cholesterol levels in the blood.

See also 
 Trace amine-associated receptor

References

Further reading 

 
 

G protein-coupled receptors